Dénes Lukács may refer to:

 Dénes Lukács (colonel) (1816–1868), Hungarian artillery commander in 1848 Revolution
 Dénes Lukács (psychologist) (living), Hungarian psychologist
 Dénes Lukács (tennis) (born 1987), Hungarian Davis Cup team player